Baymurzino (Baymırźa) is a rural locality (a village) in Bilyalovsky Selsoviet, Baymaksky District, Bashkortostan, Russia. The population was 20 as of 2010. There is 1 street.

Geography 
Baymurzino is located on the right bank of the Sakmara River, 77 km north of Baymak (the district's administrative centre) by road. Umetbayevo is the nearest rural locality.

References 

Rural localities in Baymaksky District